Karla Maritza LaVey (born July 31, 1952) is the daughter and eldest child of Church of Satan founder Anton LaVey. She is an American radio host, former high priestess of her father's organization and founder and administrator of the First Satanic Church in San Francisco, California.

Karla has been featured on television, on radio, and in news and magazine articles, including Fox News. She has lectured on the subject of Satanism around the world. She can be seen in the films Satanis: The Devil's Mass (1970), Witchcraft 70 (1970), and Speak of the Devil (1993).

Biography
Karla was born to Carole Lansing and Anton LaVey in San Francisco. She has two half siblings, Zeena Schreck and Satan Xerxes Carnacki LaVey. She founded the First Satanic Church headquartered in San Francisco in 1999. She was a founding member of her father's Church of Satan, and acted as a public representative for both the church and her father for the better part of four decades. In the 1970s, she was very close friends with Alice Cooper, whom she later introduced to her father.

In 1979, Karla was dispatched to Amsterdam to oversee the International Church of Satan headquarters which acted as a liaison to its members overseas. During this time, Karla was given the title High Priestess of the Church of Satan, which she would occasionally use in interviews with print media and her lecture tours. Throughout the 1990s, Karla made numerous appearances on television combating the Satanic Panic that seemed so prevalent for that time. Some of her appearances included the Joan Rivers Show, Ron Reagan Show, 20/20, and 60 Minutes.

On October 29, 1997 Anton LaVey died of pulmonary edema. Being the next of kin to Anton LaVey, Karla held a press conference on November 7, 1997, to announce her father's death. It was at this time that Blanche Barton and Karla LaVey announced that they would run the Church of Satan jointly as co-high priestesses.

Several days after Anton LaVey's death, Barton produced a hand written will claiming that LaVey had left all of his belongings, property, writings, and royalties, including the Church of Satan, to Barton's toddler son who had been fathered by LaVey. The entire LaVey estate, Barton claimed, was to be put in a trust for the son, managed by Barton. Karla contested this will, and the San Francisco probate court subsequently decreed the will to be invalid.

A few years later, on October 31, 2001, a court settlement was reached in which Anton's belongings, intellectual property, and royalties would be split equally among his three children: Karla; Zeena; and LaVey's son by Barton (Satan Xerxes Carnacki LaVey, also known as Ethan Clarke). The settlement also stipulated that Barton would receive the "corporation known as Church of Satan".

Under Blanche Barton's leadership, the Church of Satan was moved to New York City, and Barton handed the corporate title over to Peter Gilmore, who now runs the business with his wife Peggy Nadramia.

In 1999, Karla decided to continue her father's work by starting her own Satanic organization in his memory called the First Satanic Church, running it out of San Francisco just as her father had. Currently, Karla LaVey promotes and sponsors live Satanic events, shows, and concerts. She also hosts a weekly radio show in San Francisco. She is married.

See also
Anton LaVey
First Satanic Church

References

External links
Official First Satanic Church Website
Official First Satanic Church MySpace

Living people
American LaVeyan Satanists
1952 births
Church of Satan
American occultists
American people of Russian descent
American people of Ukrainian descent
People from San Francisco